"Krippy Kush" is a song by Puerto Rican rappers Farruko and Bad Bunny featuring Jamaican producer Rvssian. It was released by Sony Music Latin on August 3, 2017. The song was written by the two rappers, Rvssian, Franklin Martínez and Thomas Richard. A remix featuring Nicki Minaj and 21 Savage or Travis Scott was released on November 27, 2017.

Music video
The video of "Krippy Kush" was released on August 3, 2017 on Farruko's YouTube channel. As of March 2022, the music video for the song has over 760 million views on YouTube. A video for the remix, featuring Nicki Minaj and Travis Scott, was released on December 22, 2017 and has garnered over 100 million views as of March 2022.

Charts

Weekly charts

Year-end charts

Certifications

References

2017 singles
2017 songs
Bad Bunny songs
Spanish-language songs
Songs written by Bad Bunny
Farruko songs
Nicki Minaj songs
Songs written by Nicki Minaj
Travis Scott songs
Songs written by Travis Scott
21 Savage songs
Songs written by 21 Savage
Songs about drugs
Songs about cannabis